Cleveland School may refer to:

 Cleveland School (Clayton, North Carolina), which is listed on the National Register of Historic Places (NRHP)
 Cleveland School of the Arts, a public high school in Cleveland, Ohio
 Cleveland School (arts community), the artists who achieved success after attending the Cleveland School of Art
 Cleveland School, of Cleveland, Arkansas, whose Cafeteria Building-Cleveland School is NRHP-listed
 Cleveland Court School, Lakeland, Florida, which is NRHP-listed
 Cleveland Institute of Art, a private college in Cleveland, Ohio, that was named Cleveland School of Art from 1891 to 1948

See also
 Cleveland City Schools (disambiguation)
 Cleveland College (disambiguation)
 Cleveland Elementary School (disambiguation)
 Cleveland High School (disambiguation)
 Cleveland Middle School (disambiguation)
 Cleveland school shooting (disambiguation)
 Cleveland University (disambiguation)